The 2018 Jersey general election was held on 16 May 2018 to elect the 49 members of the States Assembly.

Electoral system 
At the time of the election, the 49 members of the States consisted of three different types of members. The 29 deputies were elected from 18 districts; nine districts elected one deputy, five districts elected two deputies, two districts elected three deputies, and two districts elected four deputies, with voters able to cast as many votes as there were seats in their district. The 12 constables were elected from each of the 12 parishes, although only one didn't get elected unopposed, whilst the eight senators are elected on an island-wide basis, with each voter casting up to eight votes.

Results

Senatorial election 
Candidates in bold were elected to office.

Parish elections 
Candidates in bold were elected to office.

C stands for Connétable.

D stands for Deputy.

Grouville

St Brelade

St Clement

St Helier

St John

St Lawrence

St Martin

St Mary

St Ouen

St Peter

St Saviour

Trinity

References

External links

018
2018 elections in Europe
May 2018 events in Europe
2018 in Jersey